Leutnant August Burkard was a World War I flying ace credited with six aerial victories.

Military career
 See also Aerial victory standards of World War I

On 1 June 1918, Burkard was posted to Jagdstaffel 29, a Fokker D.VII fighter squadron commanded by Harald Auffarth. On the 27th, Burkard staked his first victory claim, which was unconfirmed. He also received the Iron Cross First Class that day. Subsequently, he would score six confirmed victories between 8 August and 16 October 1918.

Endnotes

References

 Franks, Norman; Bailey, Frank W.; Guest, Russell. Above the Lines: The Aces and Fighter Units of the German Air Service, Naval Air Service and Flanders Marine Corps, 1914–1918. Grub Street, 1993. , .

 Franks, Norman. Fokker D VII Aces of World War 1, Part 2. Osprey Publishing, 2004. , 9781841767291.

Year of birth missing
Year of death missing
German World War I flying aces
Recipients of the Iron Cross (1914), 1st class